Gregory Paul Meisner (born April 23, 1959) is a former American football defensive lineman and current high school athletics director. From 1981 to 1991, Meisner played for the Los Angeles Rams, Kansas City Chiefs and New York Giants of the National Football League.

Meisner graduated from Valley High School at New Kensington, Pennsylvania in 1977.

He helped the Rams win the 1985 NFC West Division.

The Chiefs defense he played with in 1989 led the AFC in fewest total yards allowed and fewest passing yards allowed.

In 11 seasons he had 12 sacks, one interception for 20 yards and a kickoff return for 17 yards.

Meisner was the head coach of the Hempfield Area High School football team in Greensburg, Pennsylvania with a record of (17-50) by the time he resigned on November 18, 2011; however, he is still the Athletic Director.

Meisner has two sons who went to Division I schools for football. His son Greg Jr. went to the University of Kentucky and Shane went to Rutgers University.

References

1959 births
Living people
American football defensive ends
American football defensive tackles
Players of American football from Pennsylvania
Los Angeles Rams players
Kansas City Chiefs players
New York Giants players
Pittsburgh Panthers football players
People from New Kensington, Pennsylvania
National Football League replacement players